Eli and the Thirteenth Confession is the second album by New York City-born singer, songwriter, and pianist Laura Nyro, released in 1968.

History
Nyro premiered some of the songs that were to appear on the album at the 1967 Monterey Pop Festival. The song "Luckie" was derived from an earlier composition Nyro had played at her audition for Verve Records in 1966. Before she signed to Columbia Records, Verve had already planned to release the album, under the title Soul Picnic.
The album saw its actual release in 1968 on the Columbia label and became one of the year's underground successes. The album was written entirely by Nyro, arranged by Charlie Calello and produced by both.

The front cover was taken by Bob Cato. Writer Michele Kort said that Nyro resembled a "dark Madonna with luxuriant red lips." The back cover is a black-and-white silhouetted photo of Nyro kissing the head of what appears to be her younger self. According to Nyro, she was "kissing seventeen years of her life—her childhood—goodbye." On Nyro's insistence, the album's lyric sheet was printed with perfumed ink, and Kort wrote in 2002 that it still maintained a pleasant scent.

The album's themes are of passion, love, romance, death, and drugs, and the songs are delivered in Nyro's distinctive brash, belting vocals. Musically, it is a multi-layered and opulent work, including multi-tracked vocals and strings. The album's loose genre is pop, but it also incorporates elements of soul, gospel, jazz, and rock.

It is generally considered to be Nyro's most accessible and most famous work, although it is arguably not the most commercially successful or critically favored (both honors go to the follow-up, New York Tendaberry). The album was her first chart entry, reaching No. 181 on the Billboard 200, when it was known as "Pop Albums." In the February 2016 issue of UNCUT magazine it was rated in the 100 Greatest Albums of All Time.  Many musicians, including Elton John and Todd Rundgren were directly influenced by the album and bandleader Paul Shaffer told CBC Television's George Stroumboulopoulos that he considers this album to be his one "desert island record".

The album is second only to its predecessor, 1967's More Than a New Discovery, in producing hit songs for other artists. Three Dog Night took "Eli's Comin'" to US No. 10, while The 5th Dimension went to US No. 3 with "Stoned Soul Picnic" and US No. 13 with "Sweet Blindness".

Legacy
The legacy of the album is evident on the 1997 compilation Stoned Soul Picnic: The Best of Laura Nyro, which includes 6 songs from the 1968 album.

Six songs from Eli and the Thirteenth Confession are included in the ballet Quintet performed by the Alvin Ailey American Dance Theater. Rolling Stone ranked it No. 463 in the 2020 edition of their 500 Greatest Albums of All Time.

Reissues
Eli and the Thirteenth Confession was reissued in expanded and remastered format during the summer of 2002. The reissue was produced by Al Quaglieri, with Laura Grover as project director. The reissue featured three previously unreleased demos recorded on November 29, 1967. The 20-year-old Nyro performed the spare, solo demos of "Lu", "Stoned Soul Picnic" and "Emmie" on piano and multi-tracked her own voice to add harmonies. The accompanying booklet includes photographs and recording details, as well as liner notes by Rick Petreycik and a back-cover recollection by Phoebe Snow. The remastered version was issued alongside remastered/expanded editions of New York Tendaberry and Gonna Take a Miracle.

In August 2011, the album was re-released in audiophile vinyl by label "Music on Vinyl", using high-resolution digital audio at 96 kHz / 24 bit.

In June 2016, Audio Fidelity reissued the album on hybrid Super Audio CD. It contains the original stereo version in high-resolution digital audio as well as a previously unreleased 4-channel quadraphonic mix, which was created in 1971. Prior to this release only one track, "Eli's Comin'", had been released in quad on a rare Columbia Records sampler LP.

Track listing

Personnel
Laura Nyro – piano, keyboards, vocal, harmonies, "witness to the confession"
Ralph Casale, Chet Amsterdam – acoustic guitar
Hugh McCracken – electric guitar
Chuck Rainey, Chet Amsterdam – bass
Artie Schroeck – drums, vibes
Buddy Saltzman – drums
Dave Carey – percussion
Bernie Glow, Pat Calello, Ernie Royal – trumpet
George Young, Zoot Sims – saxophone
Wayne Andre, Jimmy Cleveland, Ray DeSio – trombone
Joe Farrell – saxophone, flute
Paul Griffin –  piano on "Eli's Comin'" and "Once It Was Alright Now (Farmer Joe)"
Technical
Charlie Calello – producer, arrangements
Roy Segal, Stan Tonkel – engineer
David Geffen - management "agent and friend"
Bob Cato – photography

Bibliography
Michele Kort, Soul Picnic: The Music and Passion of Laura Nyro,

References

External links
[ AllMusic Laura Nyro biography entry]
Laura Nyro official website

Laura Nyro albums
1968 albums
Albums arranged by Charles Calello
Albums produced by Charles Calello
Columbia Records albums
CBS Records albums
Albums produced by Laura Nyro